William McConnell may refer to:

 William J. McConnell (1839–1925), US senator from Idaho
 William McConnell (illustrator) (1833–1867), English illustrator and cartoonist
 William McConnell (footballer) (1889–1966), Irish sportsman
 William McConnell (trade unionist) (died 1928), British trade unionist and political activist
 William B. McConnell (1849–1931), justice of the Dakota Territorial Supreme Court

See also 
 Billy McConnell (disambiguation)
 William McConnel, British Industrialist
 William McConnell Wilton, Unionist politician from Northern Ireland